The Corsican Guard Affair was an event in French and papal history, illustrating Louis XIV of France's will to impose his power on other European leaders.

On 20 August 1662, soldiers of pope Alexander VII's Corsican Guard came to blows with the Frenchmen guarding the French embassy in Rome. Shots were fired at the coach of Charles III de Créquy, the French ambassador, leaving several dead and wounded, including one of the ambassador's pages.

In effect, some time earlier, a crime had been prevented by the Corsican guards on the orders of cardinal Flavio Chigi (Alexander's nephew), in the gardens of cardinal Rinaldo d'Este's villa. D'Este was very angry and appealed to foreign ministers to end arbitration. De Créquy was sent to Rome by Louis as ambassador extraordinary to put an end to the conflict between the cardinal and the papal guards and so he was accompanied by several soldiers.

The situation broke down when the duke's soldiers passed through a tobacco shop and reviled two Corsican guards in a Roman cabaret. The perpetrators were punished, but this did not satisfy Alexander or his guards, with the latter wanting to avenge the affront, leading to the incident on 20 August 1662. The pope did not react to the incident and Louis ordered the duke to leave Rome and summoned the papal nuncio to Paris - in effect, a breaking-off of diplomatic relations - while the parlement d'Aix decided that France should annex the papal possessions in Avignon.

On 12 February 1664 agreement was reached in the Treaty of Pisa. The governor of Rome was forced to come to Paris to explain the incident, the Corsican guard was dissolved and a pyramid built in Rome to mark the site of the incident. The papal legate, cardinal Chigi, appeared before Louis on 29 July 1664 and publicly apologised for the incident, on which France returned Avignon to the pope. 

The incident was commemorated by a tapestry now on show at the château de Fontainebleau, a section of the ceiling of the Hall of Mirrors in Versailles, and a bronze medallion from a side lantern of the Louis XIV Victory Monument which is now kept at the Louvre.

Sources 
 The Corsican Guard on corsicanews 
 The Affair on Albiana 

1662 in France
1662 in Italy
History of Corsica
History of the papacy
Ancien Régime